was a Japanese politician serving in the House of Representatives in the Diet (national legislature) as a member of the Liberal Democratic Party.

Biography 
A native of Naha, Okinawa and high school graduate he was elected to the Diet for the first time in 1983 after serving in local assemblies in Okinawa.

References

External links 
  in Japanese.

1931 births
2018 deaths
People from Naha
Members of the House of Representatives (Japan)
Liberal Democratic Party (Japan) politicians
21st-century Japanese politicians